The Goode–Hall House, also commonly known as Saunders Hall, is a historic plantation house in the Tennessee River Valley near Town Creek, Alabama. It was added to the National Register of Historic Places on October 1, 1974, due to its architectural significance.

History
The house was built in 1824 by Turner Saunders, a Methodist minister and planter originally from Brunswick County, Virginia.  After living in the house for a little more than a decade, Saunders sold it in 1844 to Freeman Goode.  The house was later acquired by the Hall family and then, in the 1940s, it passed into the care of the Mauldin family when they purchased the  farm property that the house sits on.  It remains in the Mauldin family today, although they have never resided there because of its remote nature.

Architecture
The house is built in a provincial interpretation of a Palladian three-part plan, possibly influenced by the Jeffersonian architecture of Saunders' native Virginia. The cramped proximity of the three front triangular pediments betray the vernacular nature of the composition, although the remainder is well-proportioned.

The entire house is constructed in brick above a raised basement. The two-story main block features a  Tuscan portico with an arched lunette in the pediment, this feature was a common Jeffersonian architectural device.  The main block is flanked to either side by one-story wings with front and side gables, their front pediments also have lunettes.  The front walls of the wings feature brick pilasters with simple capitals.  The front door is noteworthy in that it features two engaged Tuscan columns supporting a molded cornice.

The Goode–Hall House was not the only large plantation house built in the area by the Saunders family.  Turner Saunder's son, James, built a large Italianate house at Rocky Hill Castle.

See also
National Register of Historic Places listings in Lawrence County, Alabama

References

National Register of Historic Places in Lawrence County, Alabama
Houses in Lawrence County, Alabama
Houses on the National Register of Historic Places in Alabama
Palladian Revival architecture in Alabama
Houses completed in 1830
Plantation houses in Alabama
1830 establishments in Alabama